The parish Church of St. Quiricus and St. Julietta in Tickenham, Somerset, England, has 11th-century origins, with the nave and chancel being extended by the addition of aisles and the south chapel in the early 13th century. It has been designated as a Grade I listed building.

The church's dedication to the saints Quiricus and Julietta is extremely unusual – there are three similar dedications in the UK, two in Cornwall at Luxulyan and St Veep, and one at Swaffham Prior, in Cambridgeshire.

History

The oldest part of the church is the chancel which has a low Norman arch. Aisles were added to the nave and chancel in the early 13th century. The south aisle west window and north aisle windows date from the mid 14th century. The tower was added in 1497. It was formerly known as the Bave Chapel after the Bave family of Barrow Court.

Fittings
The baptismal font in the south aisle dates from around 1300, and consists of a square bowl with blank trefoiled pointed arch-heads, central shaft and four slimmer Purbeck shafts. There is also a hexagonal Jacobean carved wooden pulpit in the nave.

The chancel altar and chapel altar are supported by columns of Elton ware, gift of Sir Edmund Elton, 8th Baronet, in 1895. The stained glass windows include a small early 14th-century figures of Christ Crucified and Christ in Majesty in south aisle. There are also later 14th-century fragments in the north aisle windows.

See also

 List of Grade I listed buildings in North Somerset
 List of towers in Somerset
 List of ecclesiastical parishes in the Diocese of Bath and Wells

References

Church of England church buildings in North Somerset
Grade I listed churches in Somerset
11th-century church buildings in England
Grade I listed buildings in North Somerset